A. Venkatesh may refer to:

 A. Venkatesh (director)
 A. Venkatesh (cinematographer)